Phrynobatrachus rungwensis is a species of frog in the family Phrynobatrachidae. It is found in southeastern Democratic Republic of the Congo, central and northern Malawi, and east to southern and central Tanzania. It is also expected to occur in northeastern Zambia. Common names Rungwe puddle frog and Rungwe river frog have been coined for it. It is named after Mount Rungwe, its type locality.

Description
Adult males measure  (possibly as much 23 mm) and adult females  in snout–vent length. The tympanum is indistinct. The original species description (based on a single female) reported fingers and toes as tapered and not dilated, but middle toes have also been reported as being expanded into small discs, with circummarginal grooves sometimes present. The toes have some webbing. Females have throat that is blotched with brown, whereas the gular region in males is greyish or speckled. In preserved specimens, the dorsum is dusky brown and heavily overlaid with black. The venter is white.

Habitat and conservation
It is often found near grassy pools, puddles, and marshes, its presumed breeding habitat. It is a common species in suitable habitats and unlikely to face significant threats. It occurs in the Upemba National Park in the Democratic Republic of Congo, and likely in other protected areas too.

References

rungwensis
Frogs of Africa
Amphibians of the Democratic Republic of the Congo
Amphibians of Malawi
Amphibians of Tanzania
Taxa named by Arthur Loveridge
Amphibians described in 1932
Taxonomy articles created by Polbot